Vartan Achkarian (January 22, 1936 – July 28, 2012) was the Armenian Catholic titular bishop of Tokat degli Armeni and auxiliary bishop of Beirut.

Ordained to the priesthood in 1961, Achkarian became bishop in 1987 and retired in 2011.

Notes

Armenian Catholic bishops
1936 births
2012 deaths
20th-century Eastern Catholic bishops
21st-century Eastern Catholic bishops
Lebanese people of Armenian descent